Snälla Py ("Kind/Nice Py") was the 2000 edition of Sveriges Radio's Christmas Calendar.

Plot 

The series is a musical-based story, set in the town of Luleå in Sweden. The main character is a girl named "Py". A recurring theme is the question of what it means to be a kind person.

CD 
The series was released to CD the same year by the  label.

References 

2000 radio programme debuts
2000 radio programme endings
Sveriges Radio's Christmas Calendar
Luleå in fiction